Sightsavers is an international non-governmental organisation that works with partners in developing countries to treat and prevent avoidable blindness, and promote equality for people with visual impairments and other disabilities. It is based in Haywards Heath in the United Kingdom, with branches in Sweden, Norway, India, Italy, Republic of Ireland, the United Arab Emirates, and the US.

The charity was founded in 1950 by Sir John Wilson and was originally called the British Empire Society for the Blind, then the Royal Commonwealth Society for the Blind. Its patron is Princess Alexandra. Between 1950 and 2018, Sightsavers had distributed over 1 billion treatments to prevent potentially debilitating diseases  and supported 7.3 million sight-restoring cataract operations.

History
In 1950 Sir John Wilson, himself blind, set up an international organisation to help people in the world’s poorest countries see again. In its first year, the organisation (then known as the British Empire Society for the Blind) formed national organisations for blind people in six countries, initially concentrating on education, rehabilitation and welfare.

In 1953, a number of surveys were conducted in West Africa to determine the extent of the various eye conditions. These proved that 80 per cent of blindness was either preventable or curable. Along with trachoma, onchocerciasis (also known as river blindness, a term coined by Sir John’s wife Lady Jean Wilson) was identified as a major cause of blindness in West Africa.

Several pioneer schemes in rural training were set up in 1955 with the aim of integrating blind people into their communities by teaching useful skills such as crop cultivation, fishing, herding and rural crafts. Sir John observed that "In economic terms the cost of blindness is astonishing. Investing in training schemes is crucial in relieving this financial strain and allowing blind people to become independent and self-sufficient." The following year, the first eye clinics were set up in Nigeria.

The changing political attitude towards Britain’s overseas territories resulted in a change of name in 1957 and organisation became known as the Commonwealth Society for the Blind. Royal status (RCSB) was conferred by the Queen a year later.

In 1960, the first mobile eye units appeared in Kenya and Uganda. In 1964, the charity’s first eye camp in Asia was held at Spencer Eye Hospital in Karachi, Pakistan. Sir John recognised the potential of these camps to deliver the world’s largest sight restoring programme.

In the late 1960s, an experiment was launched in Katsina, Nigeria to determine whether blind children could be educated in local schools with the assistance of itinerant teachers. The scheme proved highly successful and was the forerunner of Sightsavers’ Inclusive Education Programme.

In 1977 the first permanent base hospitals were established in India to provide low-cost mass treatment. By 1980 more emphasis was being put on local training, which was recognised as key to the success of eye health programmes. In Malawi a training course for ophthalmic assistants was set up, and this now serves much of central and southern Africa.

In 1984, a gas leak in Bhopal, India, killed up to 8,000 people and temporarily blinded many more. The RCSB was the first relief to arrive and a UK disaster appeal was launched to fund the construction of a new eye hospital to treat the injured. In 1987, Blue Peter launched its ‘Sight Savers’ appeal, raising over £2 million for eye care across Africa, and RCSB subsequently adopted the title Sightsavers. The same year, pharmaceutical company Merck released Mectizan®, as trade name for Ivermectin, a drug which killed the blindness-causing stage of the worms that cause onchocerciasis. Sightsavers could now begin a preventative distribution programme.

Around 1994, Sightsavers was instrumental in the development of the Comprehensive Eye Services (CES) model, incorporating screening, treatment, surgery, education and training through to rehabilitation services. The model was designed to be replicated in new regions and countries. Sightsavers also set up training courses in new surgical techniques and supported the manufacture of replacement intraocular lenses in India.

In Sightsavers’ 50th year in 2000, a cataract campaign restored sight to over 400,000 people. The year also saw the launch of Vision 2020, a joint initiative with the World Health Organization and 19 international eye care organisations, including Sightsavers. Vision 2020 was created with the goal of eliminating avoidable blindness by 2020. Also in 2000, Sightsavers participated in the first World Sight Day, which is now held annually in October.

In 2012, Sightsavers led a consortium to set up the Global Trachoma Mapping Project, funded by the UK Department for International Development. The project aimed to map the prevalence of trachoma by using mobile phones to collect and transmit data to pinpoint the disease in 29 countries. The project was completed in 2016 and was the largest infectious disease survey ever undertaken.

In 2013, Sightsavers launched its first policy campaign, Put Us in the Picture, calling for global development to be inclusive of people with disabilities. In December 2018, the campaign's main goal was achieved (for the UK government to publish a disability strategy outlining how it would ensure global aid was disability-inclusive). The campaign relaunched as Equal World in 2019, with a broader global call for the United Nations and its member states to uphold disability rights. In the latter half of 2019 a petition for the campaign gained 50,000 signatures worldwide and was handed in to the UN Under-Secretary-General in December 2019.

In December 2017, Sightsavers celebrated its one billionth treatment for neglected tropical diseases (NTDs).

Reviews

In November 2016, charity evaluator GiveWell included Sightsavers in its list of top charities for that year, for the organisation's work on deworming programs, and published a review of the Sightsavers' work on that front. GiveWell also expects Good Ventures, a foundation it works closely with, to grant Sightsavers $3.0 million out of Good Ventures' budget of $50 million to give to GiveWell top charities.

See also
 International Resources for the Improvement of Sight
 Iris Fund for Prevention of Blindness
 Orbis International
 Seeing is Believing (organization)

References

External links 
 Sightsavers website
 Sightsavers India
 Sightsavers Norway
 Sightsavers Italy

1950 establishments in the United Kingdom
Blindness organisations in the United Kingdom
Charities based in West Sussex
Health charities in the United Kingdom
Ophthalmology organizations
International medical and health organizations
Organisations based in the United Kingdom with royal patronage
Organizations established in 1950
Eye care